The Magistrate is a 1921 British silent comedy film directed by Bannister Merwin and starring Tom Reynolds, Maudie Dunham and Ethel Warwick. It is based on the 1885 play The Magistrate by Arthur Wing Pinero.

Cast
 Tom Reynolds as Poskett
 Maudie Dunham as Beattie Tomlinson
 Ethel Warwick as Agatha Poskett
 Roy Royston as Cis Farringdon
 Cyril Percival as Captain Horace Vail
 Dawson Millward as Colonel Lukyn
 Nell Graham as Charlotte Poskett

References

Bibliography
 Low, Rachael. History of the British Film, 1918-1929. George Allen & Unwin, 1971.

1921 films
1921 comedy films
British comedy films
British silent feature films
Films directed by Bannister Merwin
Films set in London
British films based on plays
British black-and-white films
1920s English-language films
1920s British films
Silent comedy films